Vought was an American aircraft company founded by Chance M. Vought.

Vought may also refer to:

 Chance M. Vought (1890–1930), American aviation pioneer and engineer, co-founder of the Lewis and Vought Corporation, and founder of the Vought company.
 Russell Vought, an American political organizer and government official.